Finborough may refer to

 Finborough Hall, now Finborough School, Suffolk
 The Finborough Theatre, Earls Court, London
 Great Finborough, Suffolk
 Little Finborough, Suffolk